Wilhelm Schilling (30 January 1915 – 14 March 2000) was a Luftwaffe fighter ace and recipient of the Knight's Cross of the Iron Cross during World War II. The Knight's Cross of the Iron Cross was awarded to recognise extreme battlefield bravery or successful military leadership - for the fighter pilots, it was a measure of skill and combat success. He was credited with at least 50 victories in 538 missions.

Career

Upon finishing flight training, Wilhelm Schilling joined 3./JG 21 as an Unteroffizier. He gained his first victory during the Battle of France, shooting down a Hurricane fighter on 12 May 1940 over Brussels. In the ensuing Battle of Britain (by which time his unit had been renamed 9./JG 54) he added three more victories: a Spitfire on 12 August 1940, another on 5 September near Ashford, and a Bristol Blenheim bomber over the North Sea on 8 November.

The unit was then transferred to the Balkans and Bucharest, before going to the Eastern Front to prepare for Operation Barbarossa. His first victory of the campaign was on the second day, 23 June 1941, when he shot down a Russian SB-2 bomber. III./JG 54 was based in the north covering the advance to, and siege of, Leningrad. By the end of the year, he had 17 victories. He hadn't advanced his score by 14 February 1942, when he was seriously wounded by Russian ground fire. Returning to the Leningrad Front in March 1942, he was awarded the Ehrenpokal (Goblet of Honour) on 1 July and the German Cross in Gold on 4 August. But he was wounded again by anti-aircraft fire, on September 16, 1942 over Dubrovka in Bf 109 G-2 "Yellow 3" after shooting down an Il-2 bomber. While recovering in hospital at the front he was awarded the Ritterkreuz on 10 October for his 46 victories at the time.

In February 1943, III./JG 54 was withdrawn from the Eastern Front to Defence of the Reich duties, in a misguided attempt to rotate the fighter units between west and east. But for the pilots of III./JG 54, used to low-level combats, being thrown in against the United States Army Air Forces (USAAF) four-engined bombers at high altitude it was a disaster. In its first two missions the unit lost 15 planes and some of its best pilots. However, they persisted and things gradually improved. Now commissioned as an officer, on 1 August Schilling was promoted to Oberleutnant, and a month later he was promoted to Staffelkapitän (Squadron Leader) of 9./JG 54 in September 1943.

On 20 February 1944, the 8th Air Force started its Big Week against the Reich's industry. By now Schilling had added a further four victories, including three four-engined bombers. During the week III./JG 54 was heavily engaged, suffering considerable losses but inflicting only light damage on the bomber formations. On the first day, February 20, he was seriously injured over Dehnsen/Alfeld while flying Bf 109 G-6 "Yellow 1" (Werknummer 440141 — factory number) but made a successful forced-landing.

After his recovery, he was transferred back to the Eastern Front, as Staffelkapitän of 5./JG 54, on 4 May 1944. With the siege of Leningrad finally lifted, they were now based in Estonia. In June II./JG 54 was transferred across to Finland as combat support over the Karelian isthmus as the Soviets launched an attack to try and knock Finland out of the war. By July, they were back in Estonia with intense air activity, as another Soviet offensive aimed to turn the flanks of Army Group North either end of Lake Peipus. Then, on 22 August, he was finally transferred back to the Reich, as a fighter-instructor in 1./Ergänzungs-Jagdgruppe Ost (renamed 1./ErgJG Nord on 1 September. On 15 January 1945 he was made Staffelkapitän of the training unit 4./EJG 1,(renamed 10./EJG 1 in April 1945) where he served till the war's end.

Wilhelm Schilling was credited with 50 victories (plus 13 more unconfirmed) in 538 missions, 41 of them on the Eastern Front.

Summary of career

Aerial victory claims
According to US historian David T. Zabecki, Schilling was credited with 63 aerial victories.

Awards
 Iron Cross (1939)
 2nd Class
 1st Class
 Wound Badge in Black or Silver
 Front Flying Clasp of the Luftwaffe in Gold with Pennant
 Ehrenpokal der Luftwaffe (1 July 1942)
 German Cross in Gold on 4 August 1942 as Oberfeldwebel in the III./Jagdgeschwader 54
 Knight's Cross of the Iron Cross on 10 October 1942 as Oberfeldwebel and pilot in the 9./Jagdgeschwader 54

Notes

References

Citations

Bibliography

 Barbas, Bernd (1985). Planes of the Luftwaffe Fighter Aces Vol II. Kookaburra Technical Publishing. 	, with picture p. 163
 Bergström. Christer; Dikov, Andrey; Antipov, Vlad (2006). Black Cross, Red Star Vol 3. Eagle Editions Ltd , with picture p. 235
 
 
 Patzwall K.D., Der Ehrenpokal für besondere Leistung im Luftkrieg, Studien zur Geschichte der Auszeichnungen, Band 6, Verlag Klaus D. Patzwall, Norderstedt, 2008, 
 
 Sundin, Claes & Bergström. Christer (1997). Luftwaffe Fighter Aircraft in Profile. Atglen, PA: Schiffer Military History.  including colour profile of aircraft (#64)
 Weal, John (2001). Aviation Elite Units #6: Jagdgeschwader 54 ‘Grünherz’. Oxford: Osprey Publishing Limited.  including colour profile of aircraft (#29)
 Weal, John (1999). Bf109F/G/K Aces of the Western Front. Oxford: Osprey Publishing Limited.  including colour profile of aircraft (#39)
 Weal, John (2006). Bf109 Defence of the Reich Aces. Oxford: Osprey Publishing Limited.  including colour profile of aircraft (#31)
 

1915 births
2000 deaths
People from Ząbkowice Śląskie County
People from the Province of Silesia
Luftwaffe pilots
German World War II flying aces
Recipients of the Gold German Cross
Recipients of the Knight's Cross of the Iron Cross